Paul B. Sigler ( – ) was the Henry Ford II Professor of Molecular Biophysics and Biochemistry at Yale University. Major awards included membership in the National Academy of Sciences, HHMI Investigator status, and Guggenheim and Helen Hay Whitney Fellowships. He is noted for pioneering studies of Phospholipase A2 and trp repressor amongst many others.

Biography
Prior to coming to Yale, he was a professor at the University of Chicago. He received his MD from Columbia University in 1959 and his undergraduate degree from Princeton University in 1955. After briefly practicing medicine and working as a researcher for the NIH, he would go on to earn a second doctorate, a PhD, from Cambridge University at the Laboratory of Molecular Biology working under David M. Blow before moving to the University of Chicago.

Memorials

A memorial plaque is located in front of the Bass Center for Structural Biology on Science Hill on the campus of Yale University. Yale has a Paul Sigler Memorial Prize for undergraduate research in Molecular Biophysics & Biochemistry. Yale also has sponsored Paul Sigler memorial symposia in the past. The Agouron Institute sponsored 12 Paul Sigler fellowships between 2000 and 2006.

Death 
Paul Sigler died on January 11, 2000, at New Haven, Connecticut, US, 39 days before his 66th birthday.

Selected publications

See also
 List of Guggenheim Fellowships awarded in 1974
 List of University of Chicago people

References

Further reading

External links
 
 Paul B. Sigler on AcademicTree

Princeton University alumni
American biophysicists
American biochemists
Yale University faculty
University of Chicago faculty
Yale Department of Molecular Biophysics & Biochemistry faculty
Scientists from New Haven, Connecticut
People from Chicago
Scientists from New York City
People from Cambridge
People from Princeton, New Jersey
People from Washington, D.C.
People from Richmond, Virginia
Members of the United States National Academy of Sciences
Howard Hughes Medical Investigators
1934 births
2000 deaths
Columbia University Vagelos College of Physicians and Surgeons alumni
Alumni of the University of Cambridge
Physicians from New Haven, Connecticut
Scientists from Virginia